Chekya is a census town and a gram panchayat in the Jhalda II CD block in the Purulia Sadar subdivision of the Purulia district in the state of West Bengal, India.

Geography

Location

Area overview
Purulia district forms the lowest step of the Chota Nagpur Plateau. The general scenario is undulating land with scattered hills. Jhalda subdivision, shown in the map alongside, is located in the western part of the district, bordering Jharkhand. The Subarnarekha flows along a short stretch of its western border. It is an overwhelmingly rural subdivision with 91.02% of the population living in the rural areas and 8.98% living in the urban areas. There are 3 census towns in the subdivision. The map alongside shows some of the tourist attractions in the Ajodhya Hills. The area is home to Purulia Chhau dance with spectacular masks made at Charida. The remnants of old temples and deities are found in the subdivision also, as in other parts of the district.

Note: The map alongside presents some of the notable locations in the subdivision. All places marked in the map are linked in the larger full screen map.

Demographics
According to the 2011 Census of India, Chekya had a total population of 5,995, of which 3,070 (51%) were males and 2,925 (49%) were females. There were 1,125 persons in the age range of 0–6 years. The total number of literate persons in Chekya was 2,790 (57.29% of the population over 6 years).

Infrastructure
According to the District Census Handbook 2011, Puruliya, Chekya covered an area of 1.7151 km2. There is a railway station at Jhalda 7 km away. Among the civic amenities, the protected water supply involved overhead tank, uncovered well, hand pump. It had 467 domestic electric connections and 4 road light points. Among the medical facilities it had 1 dispensary/ health centre, 1 maternity and child welfare centre, 1 veterinary hospital, 5 medicine shops. Among the educational facilities it had were 9 primary schools, 1 middle school, 1 secondary school, the nearest senior secondary school, the nearest degree college at Jhalda. Among the social, recreational and cultural facilities it had 1 auditorium/ community hall. An important commodity it produced was beedi.

Education
Chekya High School is a Bengali-medium coeducational institution established in 1987. It has facilities for teaching from class V to class XII.

Kotshila Mahavidyalaya was established in 2010 at Jiudaru.

Healthcare
Muralhar Kotshila Rural Hospital, with 30 beds at Jiudaru, is the major government medical facility in the Jhalda II CD block.

References

Cities and towns in Purulia district